Deignan is a surname that could refer to:
 Elizabeth Mary "Lizzie" Deignan (born 1988), English cyclist
 Herbert Girton Deignan (1906-1968), American ornithologist
 Kathleen P. Deignan (born 1947),  Irish-American theologian, author and singer
 Martina Deignan (late 20th c.), American actress
 Osborn Deignan (1873-1915), American navy sailor and Warrant Officer)
 Philip Deignan (born 1983), Irish cyclist
 Simon Deignan (1922–2006), Gaelic football player